Frog and Wombat is a 1998 independent children's film written and directed by Laurie Agard, about two 12-year-old girls named Jane and Allison who investigate a murder in their hometown, which they believe was committed by the middle school principal. Their investigations become more and more involved, to the point where they sneak into the principal's car and hide in it to reach his house. As they get closer to discovering the truth, he kidnaps Allison. But before he can take her to a mental hospital while outrunning Jane in a golf cart, she bashes his car and causes it to collide with a tree by coming to her rescue. The principal is arrested, taken to the police station by the police officers, and imprisoned in a county jail for kidnapping Allison.

The title derives from the nicknames the girls use over a walkie-talkie, as they refer to themselves and each other as "Frog" and "Wombat".

External links

1998 films
1990s mystery films
American independent films
American mystery films
1990s American films